Photograph manipulation involves the transformation or alteration of a photograph. Some photograph manipulations are considered to be skillful artwork, while others are considered to be unethical practices, especially when used to deceive. Photographs may be manipulated for political propaganda, to improve the appearance of a subject, for entertainment, or as humor. 

Depending on the application and intent, some photograph manipulations are considered an art form because they involve creation of unique images and in some instances, signature expressions of art by photographic artists. For example, Ansel Adams used darkroom exposure techniques, burning (darkening) and dodging (lightening) a photograph. Other techniques include retouching using ink or paint, airbrushing, double exposure, piecing photos or negatives together in the darkroom, and scratching instant films. Software tools applied to digital images range from professional applications to basic imaging software for casual users. Photoshopping is a verb for photograph manipulation as a genericized trademark of Adobe Photoshop.

Techniques 

Photo manipulation dates back to some of the earliest photographs captured on glass and tin plates during the 19th century. The practice began not long after the creation of the first photograph (1825) by Joseph Nicéphore Niépce who developed heliography and made the first photographic print from a photoengraved printing plate. Traditional photographic prints can be altered using various methods and techniques that involve manipulation directly to the print, such as retouching with ink, paint, airbrushing, or scratching Polaroids during developing (Polaroid art). Negatives can be manipulated while still in the camera using double-exposure techniques, or in the darkroom by piecing photos or negatives together. Some darkroom manipulations involved techniques such as bleaching to artfully lighten or totally wash-out parts of the photograph, or hand coloring for aesthetic purposes or to mimic a fine art painting.

In the early 19th century, photography and the technology that made it possible were rather crude and cumbersome. While the equipment and technology progressed over time, it was not until the late 20th century that photography evolved into the digital realm. In the 20th century, digital retouching became available with Quantel computers running Paintbox in professional environments, which, alongside other contemporary packages, were effectively replaced in the market by editing software for graphic imaging, such as Adobe Photoshop and GIMP. At the onset, digital photography was considered by some to be a radical new approach and was initially rejected by photographers because of its substandard quality. The transition from film to digital has been an ongoing process, although much progress was made in the early 21st century as a result of innovation that has greatly improved digital image quality while reducing the bulk and weight of cameras and equipment.

Whereas manipulating photographs with tools such as Photoshop and GIMP is generally skill-intensive and time-consuming, the 21st century has seen the arrival of image editing software powered by advanced algorithms which allow complex transformations to be mostly automated. For example, beauty filters which smooth skin tone and create more visually pleasing facial proportions (for example, by enlarging a subject's eyes) are available within a number of widely used social media apps such as Instagram and TikTok, and can be applied in real time to live video. Such features are also available in dedicated image editing mobile applications like Facetune. Some, such as FaceApp use deep-learning algorithms to automate complex, content-aware transformations, such as changing the age or gender of the subject of a photo, or modifying their facial expression.

The term deepfake was coined in 2017 to refer to realistic images and videos generated with deep-learning techniques. The alterations can be created for entertainment purposes, or more nefarious purposes such as spreading disinformation. Fraudulent creations can be used to conduct malicious attacks, political gains, financial crime, or fraud.

Political and ethical issues 

Photo manipulation has been used to deceive or persuade viewers or improve storytelling and self-expression. As early as the American Civil War, photographs were published as engravings based on more than one negative. In 1860, a photograph of the politician John Calhoun was manipulated and his body was used in another photograph with the head of the president of the United States, Abraham Lincoln. This photo credits itself as the first manipulated photo.

Joseph Stalin made use of photo retouching for propaganda purposes. On May 5, 1920, his predecessor Vladimir Lenin held a speech for Soviet troops that Leon Trotsky attended. Stalin had Trotsky retouched out of a photograph showing Trotsky in attendance. In a well known case of damnatio memoriae ("condemnation of memory") image manipulation, NKVD leader Nikolai Yezhov, after his execution in 1940, was removed from an official press photo where he was pictured with Stalin; historians subsequently nicknaming him the "Vanishing Commissar". Such censorship of images in the Soviet Union was common.

The pioneer among journalists distorting photographic images for news value was Bernarr Macfadden: in the mid-1920s, his "composograph" process involved reenacting real news events with costumed body doubles and then photographing the dramatized scenes—then pasting faces of the real news-personalities (gathered from unrelated photos) onto his staged images.

In the 1930s, artist John Heartfield used a type of photo manipulation known as the photomontage to critique Nazi propaganda.

Some ethical theories have been applied to image manipulation. During a panel on the topic of ethics in image manipulation Aude Oliva theorized that categorical shifts are necessary in order for an edited image to be viewed as a manipulation. In Image Act Theory, Carson Reynolds extended speech act theory by applying it to photo editing and image manipulations. In "How to Do Things with Pictures", William J. Mitchell details the long history of photo manipulation and discusses it critically.

Use in journalism 

A notable incident of controversial photo manipulation occurred over a photograph that was altered to fit the vertical orientation of a 1982 National Geographic magazine cover. The altered image made two Egyptian pyramids appear closer together than they actually were in the original photograph. The incident triggered a debate about the appropriateness of falsifying an image, and raised questions regarding the magazine's credibility. Shortly after the incident, Tom Kennedy, director of photography for National Geographic stated, "We no longer use that technology to manipulate elements in a photo simply to achieve a more compelling graphic effect. We regarded that afterwards as a mistake, and we wouldn't repeat that mistake today."

There are other incidents of questionable photo manipulation in journalism. One such incident occurred in early 2005 after Martha Stewart was released from prison. Newsweek used a photograph of Stewart's face on the body of a much slimmer woman for their cover, suggesting that Stewart had lost weight while in prison. Speaking about the incident in an interview, Lynn Staley, assistant managing editor at Newsweek said, "The piece that we commissioned was intended to show Martha as she would be, not necessarily as she is." Staley also explained that Newsweek disclosed on page 3 that the cover image of Martha Stewart was a composite.

Image manipulation software has affected the level of trust many viewers once had in the aphorism "the camera never lies". Images may be manipulated for fun, aesthetic reasons, or to improve the appearance of a subject but not all image manipulation is innocuous, as evidenced by the Kerry Fonda 2004 election photo controversy. The image in question was a fraudulent composite image of John Kerry taken on June 13, 1971, and Jane Fonda taken in August, 1972 sharing the same platform at a 1971 antiwar rally, the latter of which carried a fake Associated Press credit with the intent to change the public's perspective of reality.

There is a growing body of writings devoted to the ethical use of digital editing in photojournalism. In the United States, for example, the National Press Photographers Association (NPPA) established a Code of Ethics which promotes the accuracy of published images, advising that photographers "do not manipulate images [...] that can mislead viewers or misrepresent subjects." Infringements of the Code are taken very seriously, especially regarding digital alteration of published photographs, as evidenced by a case in which Pulitzer prize-nominated photographer Allan Detrich resigned his post following the revelation that a number of his photographs had been manipulated.

In 2010, a Ukrainian photographerStepan Rudik, winner of the 3rd prize story in Sports Featureswas disqualified due to violation of the rules of the World Press Photo contest. "After requesting RAW-files of the series from him, it became clear that an element had been removed from one of the original photographs." As of 2015, up to 20% of World Press Photo entries that made it to the penultimate round of the contest were disqualified after they were found to have been manipulated or post-processed with rules violations.

Retouching human subjects 
A common form of photographic manipulation, particularly in advertising, fashion, and glamour photography involves edits intended to enhance the appearance of the subject. Common transformations include smoothing skin texture, erasing scars, pimples, and other skin blemishes, slimming the subject's body, and erasing wrinkles and folds. Commentators have raised concerns that such practices may lead to unrealistic expectations and negative body image among the audience.

Use in fashion 
The photo manipulation industry has often been accused of promoting or inciting a distorted and unrealistic image of most specifically in younger people. The world of glamour photography is one specific industry that has been heavily involved with the use of photo manipulation (what many consider to be a concerning element as many people look up to celebrities in search of embodying the 'ideal figure'). Manipulation of a photo to alter a model's appearance can be used to change features such as skin complexion, hair color, body shape, and other features. Many of the alterations to skin involve removing blemishes through the use of features included within popular image editing programs which are designed for just such purposes. Photo editors may also alter the color of hair to remove roots or add shine. Additionally, the model's teeth and eyes may be made to look whiter than they are in reality. Makeup and piercings can even be edited into pictures to look as though the model was wearing them when the photo was taken. Through photo editing, the appearance of a model may be drastically changed to mask imperfections.

In an article entitled "Confessions of a Retoucher: how the modeling industry is harming women", a professional retoucher who has worked for mega-fashion brands shares the industry's secrets. Along with fixing imperfections like skin wrinkles and smoothing features, the size of the model is manipulated by either adding or subtracting visible weight. Reverse retouching is just as common as making models skinnier, "distorting the bodies of very thin models to make them appear more robust in a process called reverse retouching. It is almost worse than making someone slimmer because the image claims you can be at an unhealthy weight but still look healthy. In reality, you can't, you have to Photoshop it". Reverse retouching includes eliminating shadows from protruding bones, adding flesh over body parts, color correcting, and removing hair generated for warmth from extreme weight loss. Professionals are saying that if an image is not labeled "not retouched," then the public can assume that photograph has been modified. As the fashion industry continues to use photos that have been manipulated to idealize body types, there is a need for education about how unreal and unhealthy these images are and the negative implications they are promoting.

A digital manipulation expert, who edited and altered a lot of images for the fashion industry and wants to remain private, says it is normal to digitally manipulate a photograph of a model to make them appear thinner, regardless of actual weight. However, in the past 20 years, the practice has changed, as more celebrities are on social media and the public is now more aware of their actual appearances; it is likely that significant alterations would be noticed. The retoucher notes that the industry's goal is to make significant income in advertising, and that the unrealistic ideals cycle will continue as they have to maintain this.

Since 2012, Seventeen Magazine announced they will no longer manipulate photos of their models. The decision was made after a 14 year old girl, Julia Bluhm, petitioned that the magazine use a minimum of one unaltered photo in each of their spread per issue. The petition received over 84,000 signatures.

On social media 
Not only are photos being manipulated by professionals for the media, but with the rise of social media, everyone has easy access to editing photos they post online. Social media filters have become a major part of photo manipulation. Through apps like Snapchat, Instagram, and TikTok, users are able to manipulate photos using the back or front camera, applying pre-made filters to possibly enhance the quality of the picture, distort themselves, or even add creative elements such as text, colouring or stickers. Filters that are provided on social platforms are typically made by social media companies or are user-generated content. Frequently, social media users apply edits to their photos to correspond with text. Recent developments in photo editing include the addition of polls, GIFs, music, countdowns, donations, and links . Influencers rely on the use of filters for the purpose of engagement. Social media filtering is useful to boost follower activity, as the active use of filtering can be seen as unique . An ordinary photo versus one that has been manipulated with a filter shows social media followers that a particular influencer is creative and fascinating. When photo filtering became popular, it took the world by storm: "Meta reports that over 600 million people have used an AR effect on Facebook or Instagram" . 

That being said, there are multiple implications associated with social media and photo manipulation. Countless mobile phone applications, such as Facetune, have been created to allow smartphone users to modify personal images. These applications allow people to edit virtually every aspect of themselves in the photo. With social media users and the younger generation being exposed to an extreme amount of imagery that has been manipulated, the consequences include unrealistic body ideals that are unachievable.  

Furthermore, popular social media platforms, like TikTok have revealed filters that create an illusion of physical attributes, such as the “skinny filter” and the “perfect skin filter”. Part of the idea of perfection on Social Media comes from Japanese culture and the word "kawaii". Kawaii translates to an overall aspect of cuteness; exerting fragile, girly, and childlike emotions in Japanese. Kawaii photos exerted a sense of perfection that came from the opportunity to enhance their photos in a photo-booth setting. This notion catalyzed the first selfie phone camera by Kyocera in 1999 which led to the posting of selfies during the beginnings of MySpace in the early 2000s.  

The Proteus effect, by Jeremy Bailenson, a researcher at Stanford sums up the effects that filters have on our generation through Virtual Reality research. It was determined that an avatar with a shorter height had less confidence than an avatar who was taller. Bailenson told MIT Technology Review that  “We know that visual representations of the self, when used in a meaningful way during social interactions, do change our attitudes and behaviours,” . With social media users and the younger generation being exposed to an extreme amount of imagery that has been manipulated, the consequences include body ideals that are unachievable. Teenage girls are highly susceptible to body dysmorphia and eating disorders through the manipulation of pictures on social media. This is due to social media portraying only   unrealistic parts of the body and face which are then emulated by those who are impressionable.

In advertising 
Photo manipulation has been used in advertisement for television commercials and magazines to make their products or the person look better and more appealing than how they look in reality. Some tricks that are used with photo manipulation for advertising are: fake grill marks with eye-liner, using white glue instead of milk, or using deodorant to make vegetables look glossy.

Celebrity opposition 
Photo manipulation has triggered negative responses from both viewers and celebrities. This has led to celebrities refusing to have their photos retouched in support of the American Medical Association that has decided that "[we] must stop exposing impressionable children and teenagers to advertisements portraying models with body types only attainable with the help of photo editing software". These include Keira Knightley, Brad Pitt, Andy Roddick, Jessica Simpson, Lady Gaga, and Zendaya.

Brad Pitt had a photographer, Chuck Close, take photos of him that emphasized his flaws. Chuck Close is known for his photos that emphasize skin flaws of an individual. Pitt did so in an effort to speak out against media using image manipulation software and manipulating celebrities' photos in an attempt to hide their flaws. Kate Winslet spoke out against photo manipulation in media after GQ magazine altered her body, making it look unnaturally thin. 42-year-old Cate Blanchett appeared on the cover of Intelligent Life's 2012 March/April issue, makeup-free and without digital retouching for the first time.

In April 2010, Britney Spears agreed to release "un-airbrushed images of herself next to the digitally altered ones". The fundamental motive behind her move was to "highlight the pressure exerted on women to look perfect". In 2014, Hungarian pop vocalist and songwriter Boggie produced two music videos that achieved global attention for its stance on whitewashing in the beauty industry: the #1 MAHASZ chart hit "Parfüm" (Hungarian version) and "Nouveau Parfum" (French version) from her self-titled album Boggie, which reached two Billboard charts (#3 Jazz Album, #17 World Music Album). In the videos, the artist is shown singing as she is extensively retouched in real-time, ending with a side-by-side comparison of her natural and manipulated images as the song fades out.

Corporate opposition 
Some companies have begun to speak out against photo manipulation in advertising their products. Dove created the Dove Self-Esteem Fund and the Dove Campaign for Real Beauty to build confidence in young women, emphasizing "real beauty", or unretouched photographs, in the media. Clothing retailer Aerie's campaign #AerieREAL empasizes that their clothes are for everyone and that their advertisements have not been retouched in any way, saying "The real you is sexy."

The American Medical Association stated that is opposed to the use of photo manipulation. Dr. McAneny made a statement that altering models to such extremes creates unrealistic expectations in children and teenagers regarding body image. He also said that the practice of digitally altering the weight of models in photographs should be stopped, so that children and teenager are not exposed to body types that cannot be attained in reality. The American Medical Associations as a whole adopted a policy to work with advertisers to work on setting up guidelines for advertisements to try to limit how much digital image manipulation is used. The goal of this policy is to limit the amount of unrealistic expectations for body image in advertisement.

Government opposition 
Governments are exerting pressure on advertisers, and are starting to ban photos that are too airbrushed and edited. In the United Kingdom the Advertising Standards Authority has banned an advertisement by Lancôme featuring Julia Roberts for being misleading, stating that the flawless skin seen in the photo was too good to be true. The US is also moving in the direction of banning excessive photo manipulation where a CoverGirl model's ad was banned because it had exaggerated effects, leading to a misleading representation of the product.

In 2015, France proceeded to pass a law that battles against the use of unrealistic body images and anorexia in the fashion industry. This includes modeling and photography. The models now have to show they are healthy and have a BMI of over 18 through a note from their doctor. Employers breaking this law will be fined and can serve a jail sentence up to six months. When a creator of a photograph does not disclose that the picture is edited or retouched, no matter how small the edit, they may also receive a fine or 30% of the costs of what they used to create their ad.

In 2021, Norway enacted legislation making it a requirement to label digital manipulations of the bodies of persons when depicted in advertising. Failure to do so is punishable by a fine.

Support 
Some editors of magazine companies do not view manipulating their cover models as an issue. In an interview with the editor of the French magazine Marie Claire, she stated that their readers are not idiots and that they can tell when a model has been retouched. Also, some who support photo manipulation in the media state that the altered photographs are not the issue, but that it is the expectations that viewers have that they fail to meet, such as wanting to have the same body as a celebrity on the cover of their favorite magazine.

Opinion polling 
A survey done by United Kingdom based fashion store New Look showed that 90% of the individuals surveyed would prefer seeing a wider variety of body shapes in media. This would involve them wanting to see cover models that are not all thin, but some with more curves than others. The survey also talked about how readers view the use of photo manipulation. One statistic stated that 15% of the readers believed that the cover images are accurate depictions of the model in reality. Also, they found that 33% of women who were surveyed are aiming for a body that is impossible for them to attain.

Dove and People Weekly also did a survey to see how photo manipulation affects the self-esteem of females. In doing this, they found that 80% of the women surveyed felt insecure when seeing photos of celebrities in the media. Of the women surveyed who had lower self-esteem, 70% of them do not believe that their appearance is pretty or stylish enough in comparison to cover models.

Social and cultural implications 

The growing popularity of image manipulation has raised concern as to whether it allows for unrealistic images to be portrayed to the public. In her article "On Photography" (1977), Susan Sontag discusses the objectivity, or lack thereof, in photography, concluding that "photographs, which fiddle with the scale of the world, themselves get reduced, blown up, cropped, retouched, doctored and tricked out". A practice widely used in the magazine industry, the use of photo manipulation on an already subjective photograph creates a constructed reality for the individual and it can become difficult to differentiate fact from fiction. With the potential to alter body image, debate continues as to whether manipulated images, particularly those in magazines, contribute to self-esteem issues in both men and women.

In today's world, photo manipulation has a positive impact by developing the creativity of one's mind or maybe a negative one by removing the art and beauty of capturing something so magnificent and natural or the way it should be. According to The Huffington Post, "Photoshopping and airbrushing, many believe, are now an inherent part of the beauty industry, as are makeup, lighting and styling". In a way, these image alterations are "selling" actual people to the masses to affect responses, reactions, and emotions toward these cultural icons.

"Photoshop" as a verb 

The terms "photoshop", "photoshopped" and "photoshopping", derived from Adobe Photoshop, are ubiquitous and widely used colloquially and academically when referencing image editing software as it relates to digital manipulation and alteration of photographs. The term commonly refers to digital editing of photographs regardless of which software program is used.

Trademark owner Adobe Inc. object to what they refer to as misuse of their trademarked software name, and consider it an infringement on their trademark to use terms such as "photoshopped" or "photoshopping" as a noun or verb, in possessive form or as a slang term, to prevent "genericization" or "genericide" of the company's trademark. Separately, the Free Software Foundation advises against using "photoshop" as a verb because Adobe Photoshop is proprietary software.

In popular culture, the term photoshopping is sometimes associated with montages in the form of visual jokes, such as those published on Fark and in Mad magazine. Images may be propagated memetically via e-mail as humor or passed as actual news in a form of hoax. An example of the latter category is "Helicopter Shark", which was widely circulated as a so-called "National Geographic Photo of the Year" and was later revealed to be a hoax. Photoshop contests are games organized online with the goal of creating humorous images around a theme.

Gallery

See also

References

External links 
 
 
 Digital Tampering in the Media, Politics, and Law – a collection of digitally manipulated photos of political interest
 Hoax Photo Gallery – more manipulated photos
 Erased figures in Kagemni's tomb — discusses political image manipulation with an example from Ancient Egypt

Digital art
Photographic techniques
Photojournalism controversies
Photography controversies
Photography forgeries